Petr Hrbek (born 3 April 1969) is a Czech former professional ice hockey player who last played for Chemnitzer RSC in the German Regionalliga.

Hrbek was drafted 59th overall by the Detroit Red Wings in the 1988 NHL Entry Draft, but only played 37 games in the American Hockey League's Adirondack Red Wings. He played on 1992 Bronze Medal-winning Olympic Hockey team for Czechoslovakia.

Career statistics

Regular season and playoffs

International

References

External links

1969 births
Living people
Adirondack Red Wings players
Czech ice hockey centres
Czechoslovak ice hockey centres
Detroit Red Wings draft picks
HC Litvínov players
HC Dukla Jihlava players
HC Sparta Praha players
HC Slavia Praha players
Ice hockey players at the 1992 Winter Olympics
Ice hockey players at the 1994 Winter Olympics
Medalists at the 1992 Winter Olympics
Olympic bronze medalists for Czechoslovakia
Olympic ice hockey players of Czechoslovakia
Olympic ice hockey players of the Czech Republic
Olympic medalists in ice hockey
Ice hockey people from Prague
Czech expatriate ice hockey players in the United States
Czech expatriate ice hockey players in Sweden
Czech expatriate ice hockey players in Germany